Bryden is a surname of Lowland Scots origin. Notable people with the surname include:

Beryl Bryden (1920–1998), English jazz singer
Bill Bryden (1942–2022), Scottish stage, film, and television actor
Dave Bryden (1927–2013), Australian rules footballer
James L. Bryden (1833–1880), British epidemiologist in India
John G. Bryden (born 1937), Canadian politician from New Brunswick; MP since 1994
John H. Bryden (born 1943), Canadian historian and politician from Ontario; MP 1993–2004
Kenneth Bryden (1916–2001), Canadian politician from Ontario
Marion Bryden (1918–2013), Canadian politician from Ontario; MP 1975–90
Matthew Bryden, Canadian political analyst
Nell Bryden (born 1977), American singer-songwriter
Olivia Mary Bryden (1883–1951), English artist
Philip Bryden, Canadian law professor
Rod Bryden (born 1941), Canadian businessman; owner of the Ottawa Senators ice hockey team
T. R. Bryden (born 1959), American professional baseball player
Robert Alexander Bryden, Scottish architect

Fictional characters 
Bryden Bandweth, a Black female teenager from Project Mc²

Surnames of Lowland Scottish origin